The western mountain coati  or western dwarf coati (Nasuella olivacea) is a small procyonid, found in cloud forest and páramo at altitudes of  in the Andes of Colombia and Ecuador.

Until 2009, the western mountain coati (then simply known as the mountain coati) usually included the eastern mountain coati as a subspecies, but that species is overall smaller, somewhat shorter-tailed on average, has markedly smaller teeth, a paler olive-brown pelage, and usually a dark mid-dorsal stripe on the back (versus more rufescent or blackish, and usually without a dark mid-dorsal stripe in the western mountain coati). When the two were combined, they were rated as Data Deficient by the IUCN, but following the split the western mountain coati is considered Near Threatened. After a genetic analysis in 2020, the American Society of Mammalogists currently considers N. meridensis a synonym of N. olivacea.

There are two subspecies of the western mountain coati: N. o. olivacea and the slightly smaller and darker N. o. quitensis with less distinct rings on the tail. The former is known from Colombia and the latter from Ecuador, but the exact distribution limit between the two is not known.

References

Procyonidae
Carnivorans of South America
Mammals of the Andes
Mammals of Colombia
Mammals of Ecuador
Páramo fauna
Near threatened biota of South America
Mammals described in 1865
Taxa named by John Edward Gray